Ingold may refer to:

People
 Cecil Terence Ingold (1905–2010), British botanist and mycologist
 Christopher Kelk Ingold (1893–1970), British chemist
 Jon Ingold (born 1981), British author of interactive fiction
 Karl Ingold (?–?), US-American aviator
 Keith Usherwood Ingold (born 1929), British chemist
 Kylie InGold (born 1962), Australian artist
 Mariana Ingold (born 1958), Uruguayan composer
 Rich Ingold (1963–2017), US-American football player
 Tim Ingold (born 1948), British anthropologist
 Werner Ingold (1919–1995), Swiss chemist and entrepreneur
 Jeff Ingold, current president of Doozer Production Company and the former head of comedy at NBC
 Res Ingold (born 1954), Swiss contemporary artist. He is known for his superfiction airline company Ingold Airlines
 Ingold Baardson
 Ingold Haraldrsson
 Ingold II
 Ingold Illready
 Ingold Steinkelsson
 Ingold of Sweden (disambiguation)

Places
 Ingold, North Carolina

Science
 Thorpe–Ingold effect, an effect observed in organic chemistry where increasing the size of two substituents on a tetrahedral center leads to enhanced reactions between parts of the other two substituents